The Šmarna Gora District, or simply Šmarna Gora, is a district of the City Municipality of Ljubljana, the capital of Slovenia. It has been named after Mount Saint Mary, an inselberg in the north of the city of Ljubljana.

References

External links

Šmarna Gora District on Geopedia

 
Districts of Ljubljana